Fantasy Island was a waterpark once located at Sentosa, Singapore from 1994 to 2001, on the part of the present site of Universal Studios Singapore of the Resorts World Sentosa.

Background
Opened on 8 December 1994 at a cost of S$54 million, the waterpark had an 8-lane giant slide and a number of other high-speed water slides and other features.

Attractions
There were about 16 different water rides at waterpark, notably:
 Medusa
 Double Trouble
 Gang of Four
 Black Hole
 Flashflood
 Wild wild wet

Decline and closure
However, its popularity waned over time due to its high entrance fees and its inaccessibility. It was also known for its high injury rate that often resulted in several people getting injured, including the two drowning fatalities in 1998 and 2000 respectively. All these issues and accidents led to the eventual closure of Fantasy Island in Sentosa on 2 November 2001.

References

Buildings and structures demolished in 2002
1994 establishments in Singapore
Defunct amusement parks in Singapore
Demolished buildings and structures in Singapore
2001 disestablishments in Singapore
Sentosa
Tourist attractions in Singapore
Water parks in Singapore